James Frederick Quinn  (18 November 1904 – 3 January 1986) was an Australian rules footballer who played with Essendon in the Victorian Football League (VFL).

Family
The son of John Quinn (1870–1941) and Janet Quinn, nee McFarlane (1871–1956), James Frederick Quinn was born in West Melbourne on 18 November 1904.

Football
Quinn was a useful follower and forward who became a regular senior player and kicked 59 goals in his time with Essendon, who were disappointed to lose him when he moved to Sydney for work-related reasons.

Naval cartography
Quinn worked as a naval cartographer and for his work in chart correction for the Royal Australian Navy he was awarded the British Empire Medal in 1960.

Notes

External links 

Jim Quinn's profile at Australianfootball.com

1904 births
1986 deaths
Australian rules footballers from Melbourne
Essendon Football Club players
Recipients of the British Empire Medal
People from West Melbourne, Victoria